The Department of Transport and Main Roads, known often as TMR, is a department of the Queensland Government, formed in April 2009 with the merger of the Queensland Transport and the Department of Main Roads. The department manages Queensland's approximately 33,000 km state-controlled road network, which includes more than 6,500 bridges and major culverts.

There are more than 10,000 people working for the Department of Transport and Main Roads. It includes customer service centres, marine operation bases and regional and divisional offices. The department works with Queensland Rail, port authorities, other state and federal government departments, local governments and industry and the community.

Following the 2012 state election, Premier Campbell Newman appointed one Minister for the whole department. In 2015, Labor headed by Annastacia Palaszczuk won the state election. Jackie Trad was appointed Minister for Transport and Mark Bailey Minister for Main Roads, Road Safety and Ports. Bailey gained the Transport portfolio from Trad after the 2017 state election and the department once again reported to a single minister.

Initiatives
Because Queensland driver licences were susceptible to fraud the department initiated a smartcard driver licence project in 2003. The project has suffered from long delays and cost overruns. The transition to the new cards commenced in late 2010, and the new cards will replace laminated licences as they come up for renewal, expected to be within 6 years.

The Here For Life campaign was launched in 2009 and has been credited as being a great success in motorcycle rider safety.

Director-General 
The current Director-General of the Department of Transport and Main Roads is Neil Scales.

Organisational structure 
The department is split into five operational divisions: Policy, Planning and Investment; Customer Services, Safety and Regulation; Infrastructure Management and Delivery; Corporate; TransLink.

References

External links
 Department of Transport and Main Roads
 Maritime Safety Queensland
 TransLink
 Transport and motoring franchise
 QLDTraffic

Transport
Transport in Queensland
Government agencies established in 2009
2009 establishments in Australia
Road authorities
State departments of transport of Australia